Tony Colman (born 28 April 1961), better known by his stage name London Elektricity, is an English electronic musician and the co-founder and CEO of Hospital Records.

History
The first incarnation of London Elektricity was the duo Tony Colman and Chris Goss. Founders and backbone of Hospital Records, they also pursued parallel projects under the monikers Peter Nice Trio and Dwarf Electro, but it was their tune "Song in the Key of Knife" under the guise London Elektricity that first gained them widespread recognition. In 1999, they released their debut album Pull the Plug on Hospital Records. Although session musicians contributed a wide range of live instruments (double bass, electric guitar, brass section, flute, strings), and jazz singer Liane Carroll provided vocals on two tracks, the LP was essentially a studio work, under the control of producer/DJ duo Colman and Goss.

In 2002, Chris Goss departed to concentrate on managing Hospital Records, leaving it a solo project of Tony Colman. The second album Billion Dollar Gravy was released in 2003. During the making of the album, the session musicians began to coalesce into a band, and Colman decided to take the band live. The line-up included Colman, Andy Waterworth, Landslide, MC Wrec, the Jungle Drummer, Liane Carroll and Robert Owens, amongst others. In 2004 they released a live DVD entitled London Elektricity: Live Gravy, which was recorded in October 2003 at the Jazz Café.

2005 saw the release of their third album, Power Ballads, using the same line-up as the live band. London Elektricity announced at Pressure (the University of Warwick's drum and bass event) on 2 December 2005 that they had no plans to play live in future. They were joined on stage for the announcement by former member Chris Goss.  Tony Colman now produces and DJs drum and bass solo under the name of London Elektricity.

Colman presents the Hospital Records podcast. It generally features many releases from Hospital Records, and a wide spectrum of drum and bass from around the globe. The podcast recently won 'Best Podcast' at the BT Digital Music Awards, and has over 30,000 downloads a show. The podcast regularly involves special guests who are signed to Hospital records such as Logistics. Colman also hosted the Forza Horizon series' in-game Hospital Records radio station, alongside Goss, in Forza Horizon 2, 3,4 and 5 .

In 2007, London Elektricity won the BBC 1Xtra Xtra Bass award for best live act. London Elektricity's fourth album, Syncopated City was released in September 2008. The month before this marked his Essential Mix on BBC Radio 1.

London Elektricity's fifth album, Yikes! was released in April 2011, followed by "Are We There Yet?" in November 2015.

Influences
According to his MySpace page, Tony Colman's influences include a large array of musicians, such as Talking Heads, Fela Kuti, Kraftwerk, Brian Eno, Led Zeppelin, and others. Jazz, soul, Latin, dub, rock, and punk are present in many of London Elektricity's songs, such as "Rewind", "Attack Ships on Fire", "South Eastern Dream", "Do You Believe" (and its Dub version, "Dub You Believe"), "Main Ingredient", "Remember the Future", "Round the Corner", and "Song in the Key of Knife" (featuring an acoustic bass line).

Discography

Studio albums
 1999 – Pull the Plug
 2003 – Billion Dollar Gravy
 2005 – Power Ballads
 2008 – Syncopated City
 2011 – Yikes!
 2015 – Are We There Yet?
 2019 - Building Better Worlds
 2021 - Crikey! (Yikes, Aged 10 Years)

DJ Mixes
 2006 – Hospitalised (with High Contrast & Cyantific)
 2010 – Hospitality Presents This Is Drum + Bass (with High Contrast)

Live albums
 2004 – Live Gravy
 2006 – Live at the Scala
 2017 – Live in the Park
 2017 - Live at Pohoda

Compilation albums
 2006 – Medical History
 2007 – The Best of London Elektricity

Remix albums
 2006 – Facelift The Remixes
 2011 – Yikes! Remixes!!
 2016 – Are We There Yet? The Med School Scans
2021 – Rebuilding Better Worlds

Singles and EPs
 1996 – "Sister Stalking / "Brother Ignoramus"
 1997 – "Ultrasound"
 1998 – "Pull The Plug" / Dirty Dozen"
 1998 – "Song in the Key of Knife" / "Theme From The Land Sanction"
 1999 – "Rewind" / "Rewound"
 1999 – "Rewind (Acoustic Edit)" / "Dub You Believe"
 2000 – "Wishing Well" / "Elektric D-Funk"
 2000 – "Round The Corner"
 2001 – "My Dreams" (vs Robert Owens)
 2002 – "Cum Dancing" / "Down Low"
 2003 – "Billion Dollar Gravy" / "Harlesden"
 2004 – "Live at the Jazz Cafe"
 2005 – "The Strangest Secret in the World (45 Edit)" b/w "Pussy Galore"
 2005 – "The Mustard Song"
 2005 – "Hanging Rock"
 2006 – "Remember the Future"
 2008 – "All Hell Is Breaking Loose"
 2008 – "Syncopated City"
 2008 – "Attack Ships on Fire" / "South Eastern Dream"
 2011 – "Elektricity Will Keep Me Warm" / "The Plan That Cannot Fail"
 2011 – "Meteorites" (feat. Elsa Esmeralda)

References

External links

Interviews
HospitalityDNB Interview: London Elektricity. HospitalityDNB (28 April 2011)
London Elektricity Interview. Kmag (11 May 2011)
Interview with London Elektricity. Radio Monash (29 May 2011)
We talk to... Tony Colman aka London Elektricity. Time+Space (14 September 2011)
London Elektricity Interview. Kmag (29 May 2012)
Judge Jules VS. London Elektricity: The Interview. Big Shot (25 January 2013)
The Parklife interview: London Elektricity. The Independent (3 April 2013)
Interview: London Elektricity. Soundcavern (8 January 2014)
Hospital Records: We Are 18 – London Elektricity Interview. Muzu.TV (2 July 2014)
Stories from a Pro: London Elektricity. iZotope

British drum and bass music groups
Hospital Records artists
Liane Carroll
Musical groups from London